Tukaram Ganpatrao Renge Patil (born 21 February 1958) is an Indian National Congress politician from Parbhani , Maharashtra. he was member of the 14th Lok Sabha of India. He represented the Parbhani constituency of Maharashtra.he was also Member of Maharashtra Legislative Assembly for two terms from 1995 to 2004.

On Thursday 24 July 2008, Shiv Sena expelled him from the party for defying its whip and abstaining from voting in the Confidence motion for the UPA government.

External links
 Official biographical sketch in Parliament of India website
 Shiv Sena expels Tukaram Renge-Patil for anti-party activities

Living people
1958 births
People from Maharashtra
India MPs 2004–2009
Marathi politicians
People from Parbhani
Lok Sabha members from Maharashtra
People from Marathwada
People from Parbhani district
Indian National Congress politicians from Maharashtra
Shiv Sena politicians